The Global Gender Gap Report is an index designed to measure gender equality. It was first published in 2006 by the World Economic Forum.

It "assesses countries on how well they are dividing their resources and opportunities among their male and female populations, regardless of the overall levels of these resources and opportunities," the Report says. "By providing a comprehensible framework for assessing and comparing global gender gaps and by revealing those countries that are role models in dividing these resources equitably between women and men, the Report serves as a catalyst for greater awareness as well as greater exchange between policymakers."

Methodology 
The report's Gender Gap Index ranks countries according to calculated gender gap between women and men in four key areas: health, education, economy and politics to gauge the state of gender equality in a country.

The report examines four overall areas of inequality between men and women in 130 economies around the globe, over 93% of the world's population:
 Economic participation and opportunity – outcomes on salaries, participation levels and access to high-skilled employment
 Educational attainment – outcomes on access to basic and higher level education
 Political empowerment – outcomes on representation in decision-making structures
 Health and survival – outcomes on life expectancy and sex ratio.  In this case parity is not assumed, there are assumed to be fewer female births than male (944 female for every 1,000 males), and men are assumed to die younger.  Provided that women live at least six percent longer than men, parity is assumed. But if it is less than six percent it counts as a gender gap.

Thirteen out of the fourteen variables used to create the index are from publicly available "hard data" indicators from international organizations, such as the International Labour Organization, the United Nations Development Programme and the World Health Organization.

Upper limiting value of the Gender Gap Index 

Gender Gap Index: 3.98 / 4 =  0.9949  

This is the upper limiting value of the Gender Gap Index (limes superior) for the female-to-male ratio and for the male-to-female ratio.

WEF Global Gender Gap Index rankings
The highest possible score is 1.0 (equality or better for women, except for lifespan (106% or better for women) and gender parity at birth (94.4% or better for women) and the lowest possible score is 0.  Data for some countries are unavailable. The three highest-ranking countries have closed over 84% of their gender gaps, while the lowest-ranking country has closed only a little over 50% of its gender gap.

Limits and criticisms
The report measures women's disadvantage compared to men, and is not a measure of equality of the gender gap. Gender imbalances to the advantage of women do not affect the score. So, for example, the indicator "number of years of a female head of state (last 50 years) over male value" would score 1 if the number of years was 25, but would still score 1 if the number of years was 50. Due to this methodology, gender gaps that favor women over men are reported as equality and would not cause deficits of equality in other areas to become less visible in the score, excepted for life expectancy. To put it more simply: women could be better off in all areas and still the index would deem that country perfectly equal.

The index is designed to "measure gender-based gaps in access to resources and opportunities in countries rather than the actual level of the available resources and opportunities in those countries."

In an academic publication from 2010, Beneria and Permanyer criticized the Global Gender Gap Index for only capturing inequality in certain aspects of women's lives therefore making it an incomplete measure of gender inequality.

In an academic publication from 2019, Stoet and Geary argued that the Global Gender Gap Index has limitations as a measure of gender equality, because of the way it caps scores and because it ignores specific issues on which men are known to fall behind (e.g., risks of working in hazardous jobs). According to the Global Gender Gap Report 2021, the index do not penalize a country where women outperform men in certain aspect  and consider that parity is achieved in life expectancy only if women live five years longer than men.

See also
 Gender Empowerment Measure 
 Gender Inequality Index
 Gender-Related Development Index
 Social Institutions and Gender Index
 Female labour force in the Muslim world
 Gender pay gap
 Women's rights in 2014

Notes

References

External links
 
 Daily chart: Sex and equality, The Economist, Oct 25th 2013

Reports
 
 
 
 
 
 
 
 
 

Books about economic inequality
Economic indicators
International rankings
 
2006 documents
Equal pay for equal work